Camp Crockett was established in late 1967 on the Fort Gordon, Georgia, federal reservation for the training of soldiers preparatory to Airborne and Special Forces schools during the Vietnam war.

Located on an isolated part of the installation, the camp included a mockup of a village set up to look like one that would be encountered in Vietnam. Soldiers training at the camp were housed in Quonset huts, one of which served as a field kitchen.

Abandoned in 1969, the locations of the Quonset huts are marked by concrete slabs in a pine forest planted as part of a reforestation project instituted in 1970.

In 2010, news reports indicated that Agent Orange herbicide was applied by helicopter to 98 acres of Training Area 47 in July 1967 prior to the establishment of Camp Crockett.

References

See also
Remembering Camp Crockett (Blog)
A Camp Within A Fort: Camp Crocket, Georgia (Blog)

Buildings and structures in Richmond County, Georgia
Buildings and structures in Jefferson County, Georgia
Buildings and structures in McDuffie County, Georgia
1967 establishments in Georgia (U.S. state)
Military installations established in 1967